Río Muni (called Mbini in Fang) is the Continental Region (called Región Continental in Spanish) of Equatorial Guinea, and comprises the mainland geographical region, covering . The name is derived from the Muni River, along which the early Europeans had built the Muni River Settlements.
Regions of Equatorial Guinea

History
Río Muni was ceded by Portugal to Spain in 1778 in the Treaty of El Pardo. The Spanish had hoped to collect slaves to work in their other overseas possessions, but the settlers died of yellow fever, and the area was deserted. Cocoa and timber became major industries upon recolonization. Río Muni, along with Bioko, became a province of Spanish Guinea in 1959.

Population
In 2015, 885,015 people—about 72% of Equatorial Guinea's population—lived in Río Muni. The main languages spoken in Río Muni are Fang-Ntumu, which is spoken in the north, and Fang-Okak, which is spoken in the south. Spanish also is spoken, although only as a second language.

Provinces
Río Muni comprises five provinces: 
Centro Sur
Djibloho
Kié-Ntem
Litoral
Wele-Nzas

Cities
The largest city is Bata, which also serves as the regional administrative capital. Other major towns include Evinayong, Ebebiyín, Acalayong, Acurenam, Mongomo and Mbini.

See also
Elobey, Annobón and Corisco
Popular Idea of Equatorial Guinea
Postage stamps and postal history of Equatorial Guinea

References

Former Spanish colonies
Geography of Equatorial Guinea
Metropolitan or continental parts of states